The 2007 Canadian Soccer League season was the tenth since its establishment. The first match of the season was played on May 11, 2007, and ended on October 28, 2007. The season concluded with Toronto Croatia claiming their third championship by defeating rivals Serbian White Eagles 4-1 on aggregate making Croatia one of the most successful clubs in the history of the CSL & Canadian soccer. Toronto Croatia also celebrated its 50-year anniversary in Canadian soccer by winning the CSL title after losing just one game in the 5-month long campaign, including an unbeaten streak in their international triumph of the Croatian World Club Championship. During the regular season the Serbian White Eagles secured their second consecutive International Division title, while St. Catharines Wolves won their first National Division title.

The league decreased in membership to 10 teams since the 2004 season, but reached an affiliation with the Montreal Impact of the USL First Division where the Impact formed the Trois-Rivières Attak to serve as a farm team. The league experienced another major increase in match attendances with some clubs averaging over 1,000 fan support per game, with the Serbian White Eagles and Trois-Rivières Attak averaging the most. The season was also notable with the introduction of the inaugural Locust CSL All Star Game played on July 28, 2007 at Windsor Stadium.

Changes from 2006 season
The league decreased to 10 teams after the folding of the Caribbean Selects, and the hiatus of the Brampton Stallions.  Oakville Blue Devils moved to Scarborough, Toronto in order to become the Canadian Lions, and were transferred to the International Conference. The CSL maintained its presence in Quebec with the owners of Laval Dynamites securing a deal with the Montreal Impact of the USL First Division to form the Trois-Rivières Attak which served as a farm team for the Impact.

Teams

Final standings

International Division

National Division

CSL Championship playoffs

Quarterfinals

Semifinals

CSL Championship

Format change for Rogers Cup finals
Due to Toronto Croatia and the Serbian White Eagles playing for the Championship Cup, the CSL decided to change the format to a two-leg game rather than the standard knockout.  The first game was played on Friday, October 27, and was played in front of only Croatia fans, with the team serving as the home side.  The next day, October 28, the White Eagles was the home side, and their fans were the only ones permitted at the game.

All-Star Game

2007 scoring leaders
Full article: CSL Golden Boot

CSL Executive Committee and Staff 
A list of the 2007 CSL Executive Committee.

Individual awards 

The annual CSL awards ceremony was held on November 4, 2007 at the La Contessa Banquet Hall in North York, Toronto. For the second straight season the International Division teams accumulated the majority of the awards. Trois-Rivières Attak went home with the most awards with 3 wins. Former Montreal Impact player Nicolas Lesage received both the Golden Boot and MVP, and the club was given the Fair Play award. The league champions Toronto Croatia produced both the Defender and Rookie of the Years. Domagoj Sain became the first player in CSL history to win the Defender of the Year three times. Former 2.HNL veteran Tihomir Maletic was chosen as the Rookie of the Year.

Claudio Perri, former Atlanta University alumni was named the Goalkeeper of the Year after helping St. Catharines Wolves post the best defensive record throughout the season. James McGilivary was recognized with the honor of Coach of the Year after leading St. Catharines to their first trophy the National Division title in five years. The President of the Year award was renamed the Harry Paul Gauss award in honor of Harry Gauss, and its inaugural recipient was Bruno Ierullo. Joe Fletcher,  who later went on to officiate matches at the international level and Major League Soccer was recognized with the Referee of the Year award.

References

External links
 CSL official home page
Rocket Robin's 2007 CSL Game Reports page

2007
2007 domestic association football leagues
2007 in Canadian soccer